, real name , is a Japanese singer songwriter born on 19 March 1957 in Kita-ku, Kyoto, Kyoto Prefecture, Japan. She has written music such as Oribia o Kikinagara by Anri and Tenshi no Uinku by Seiko Matsuda, as well as many other songs. Ozaki makes irregular appearances on her friend Akira Kamiya's internet radio show Kamiya Akira Hot Beat Party. Her husband is musician Ray Ohara. Her mother is Akemi Ozaki, a maker of popular handbags and purses made from vintage obi.

History
Ozaki began studying classical piano in 1965 at the age of eight. By the time she was sixteen, after graduating from Kyoto Municipal Kinugasa Junior High School, she had begun writing her own works and participating in an amateur composers club. Her first work, Hitorikko ka Bakko, tells the story of the loneliness of searching for one's mother. She attended Kyoto Prefectural Yamashiro High School.

In 1974, Ozaki participated in her first contest, winning ¥5000 and making a favorable impression on one of the judges who indicated that he thought she was going to become a professional in the near future. She became a DJ for Fōkusu Studio in 1976, and began giving concerts where she played both guitar and piano to accompany her songs. She made her professional debut in 1976 with the Toshiba EMI Express single Contemplation / Winter Poster. Her stage name "Ami" comes from the French word for "friend".

Discography
Listed alphabetically by year.

Singles
1970s
 (1976, Toshiba EMI)
 (1976, Toshiba EMI)
 (1977, Toshiba EMI)
 (1977, Toshiba EMI)
 (1978, Toshiba EMI)
 (1978, Toshiba EMI)
 (1978, Toshiba EMI)
 (1979, Toshiba EMI)
 (1979, Toshiba EMI)
 (1979, Toshiba EMI, promotional single never sold in stores)

1980s
 (1980, Pony Canyon)
 (1980, Pony Canyon)
Love Is Easy / My Shiny Town (1981, Pony Canyon)
 (1981, Pony Canyon)
My Song for You / Foggy Night (1982, Pony Canyon)
I'm A Lady Tiger / It's Easy If You Try (1982, Pony Canyon)
 (1983, Pony Canyon)
 (1983, Pony Canyon)
 (1984, Pony Canyon)
 (1984, Pony Canyon)
 (1985, Pony Canyon)
 (1986, Pony Canyon)
 (1985, Papi, Pony Canyon)
 (1987, Pony Canyon)
 (1988, Pony Canyon)
 (1988, Pony Canyon)
 (1989, Peach Princess, Pony Canyon)

1990s
Endless Dream (1990, Pony Canyon)
Southern Cross (1990, Pony Canyon)
Heart of Glass (1992, Peach Princess Band, Pony Canyon)
My Best Friends (1992, Hira-o-Saki (with Eri Hiramatsu and Kenjirō Sakiya), Pony Canyon)
 (1992, Pony Canyon)
 (1993, Peach Princess Band, Pony Canyon)
 (1993, Pony Canyon)
 (1994, Pony Canyon)
 (1994, Pony Canyon)
 (1995, Pony Canyon)
 (1997, Toshiba EMI)
 (1998, Toshiba EMI)
 (1998, Toshiba EMI)
I Wanna Do More/Should I Do? (1999, from Magic Users Club, Toshiba EMI)

2000s
 (2005, Columbia Music Entertainment)
 (2005, Columbia Music Entertainment)

Sources:

Albums
1970s
Shady (1976, Toshiba EMI)
Mind Drops (1977, Toshiba EMI)
Prismy (1978, Toshiba EMI)
Stop Motion (1978, Toshiba EMI)
Little Fantasy (1979, Toshiba EMI)

1980s
Meridian-Melon (1980, Pony Canyon)
Air Kiss (1981, Pony Canyon)
Hot Baby (1981, Pony Canyon)
Shot (1982, Pony Canyon)
Miracle (1983, Pony Canyon)
Points (1983, Pony Canyon)
Plastic Garden (1984, Pony Canyon)
 (1985, Pony Canyon)
Kids (1986, Pony Canyon)
Points-2 (1986, Pony Canyon)
 (1987, Pony Canyon)
Amii Remix World (1988, Pony Canyon)
Dinner's Ready (1988, Pony Canyon)
Lapis Lazuli (1988, Pony Canyon)

1990s
Natural Agency (1991, Pony Canyon)
 (1992, Pony Canyon)
Hot Baby with David Foster (1992, Canyon)
Points-3 (1992, Pony Canyon)
 (1993, Pony Canyon)
Topaz (1994, Pony Canyon)
Special (1997, Toshiba EMI)
Wi2sh (1997, Toshiba EMI)
Arrows in My Eyes (1998, Toshiba EMI

2000s
The Delta-Wing I (2000, Oak Records/Omagatoki)
Amii-Phonic (2001, For Life Records)
Pia Noir (2002, BMG Fan House)
 (2004, Columbia Music Entertainment)
 (2006, Columbia Music Entertainment)

Sources:

References

External links
 
 Amii-Phonic (official site at For Life)
 Columbia Music Entertainment
 Hot Beat Radio

1957 births
Japanese women singer-songwriters
Living people
Musicians from Kyoto Prefecture
20th-century Japanese women singers
20th-century Japanese singers
21st-century Japanese women singers
21st-century Japanese singers